"Breaking Down" is a song by I Prevail from the album Trauma. 

Breaking Down may also refer to:
"Breaking Down", a song by the Black Keys from the album Let's Rock
"Breaking Down", a song by Florence + the Machine from the album Ceremonials
"Breaking Down", a song by the Mighty Lemon Drops from the album World Without End
"Breakin' Down", a song by Skid Row from the album Subhuman Race
"Breakin' Down (Sugar Samba)", a 1984 song by Julia & Company

See also
Breakdown (disambiguation)
Broken Down (disambiguation)